Military order may refer to:

Orders 
 Military order (religious society), confraternity of knights originally established as religious societies during the medieval Crusades for protection of Christianity and the Catholic Church

Military organisation and terms 
 Military order (instruction), including an individual command by an armed forces officer to a person under his command
 General order, a published directive originated by a commander of a military organization
 Operations order, an executable plan that directs a unit on how to conduct a military operation
 Close order drill, a form of military parade for ceremonial purposes
 Martial law, order and security maintained by the military when government or civilian authorities fail to function effectively
 Military justice or military law, a body of laws and procedures governing members of the armed forces

See also 
 Order (honour), a designation of merit awarded by a government, dynastic house, sovereign or organization to an individual